Panola County is the name of two counties in the United States:

 Panola County, Mississippi 
 Panola County, Texas